These are the squads for the countries that played in the 1987 Copa América held in Argentina. The first round was played in three groups of three teams with Uruguay, as defending champion, receiving a bye to the semi finals.

Group A

Argentina 
Head Coach: Carlos Bilardo

Ecuador 
Head Coach:  Luis Grimaldi

Peru 
Head Coach: Fernando Cuellar

Group B

Brazil 
Head Coach: Carlos Alberto Silva

Chile 
Head Coach: Orlando Aravena

Venezuela 
Head Coach:  Rafael Santana

Group C

Bolivia 
Head Coach:  

 Marciano Saldías and Mauricio Ramos remained on standby in Bolivia and did not travel to Argentina.

Colombia 
Head Coach: Francisco Maturana

Paraguay 
Head Coach: José Parodi

Semi-final

Uruguay 
Head Coach: Roberto Fleitas

External links 
RSSSF Copa América 1987
Worldfootball.net

Squads
Copa América squads